Delmer may refer to:

People
 Célestin Delmer (1907–1996), French footballer
 Deborah Delmer, American plant pathologist
 Isabel Nicholas (1912–1992), also known as Isabel Delmer, British painter, scenery designer and occasional model
 Sefton Delmer (1904–1977), British journalist and Second World War propagandist
 Delmer Berg (1915–2016), last surviving American veteran of the Abraham Lincoln Brigade, which fought in the Spanish Civil War
 Delmer Brown (1909–2011), American academic, historian, author, translator and Japanologist
 Delmer Daves (1904–1977), American screenwriter, film director and film producer
 Del Ennis (1925–1996), American Major League Baseball player
 Del Harris (born 1937), American basketball coach
 Delmer J. Yoakum (1915–1996), American painter and designer

Places
 Delmer, Kentucky, United States, an unincorporated community 
 Delmer, Texas, United States, an unincorporated community
 Delmer, a community within the township of South-West Oxford, Ontario, Canada

Masculine given names